Rezal Hassan (born 14 February 1975) is a retired Singaporean football goalkeeper. He played for the Singapore national team in the late-1990s and early-2000s, and was part of the Singapore team which won the regional AFF Championship in 1998. He played for Singapore Armed Forces FC, Tampines Rovers and Woodlands Wellington FC in Singapore's S.League.

Rezal was a member of the Tampines Rovers teams which won the S.League title in 2004 and 2005, and the Singapore Cup in 2002, 2004 and 2006.

Rezal played in the Singapore national team's exhibition matches against Liverpool F.C. (2–0 defeat) and Manchester United (8–1 defeat) in 2001.

Honours

Club
Singapore Armed Forces FC
S.League (4): 1997,1998,2000,2002
Singapore Cup (1): 1999

Tampines Rovers
S.League (2): 2004,2005
Singapore Cup (2): 2004,2006

International
Singapore
AFF Championship: 1998

External links

http://www.safwarriors.com.sg/home/index.php?option=com_content&view=article&id=205:a-warrior-returns-relishes-new-role&catid=8:club-happenings&Itemid=25
http://www.safwarriors.com.sg/home/index.php?option=com_content&view=article&id=201:bok-on-new-signings&catid=8:club-happenings&Itemid=25
http://www.safwarriors.com.sg/home/index.php?option=com_content&view=article&id=204:new-look-side-gets-down-to-business&catid=8:club-happenings&Itemid=25

1974 births
Living people
Singaporean footballers
Singapore international footballers
Tampines Rovers FC players
Association football goalkeepers
Woodlands Wellington FC players
Singapore Premier League players
Warriors FC players